Assycuera is a genus of beetles in the family Cerambycidae, containing the following species:

 Assycuera macrotela (Bates, 1880)
 Assycuera marcelae Martins & Galileo, 2010
 Assycuera rubella (Bates, 1892)
 Assycuera scabricollis (Chemsak, 1963)
 Assycuera waterhousei (White, 1855)

References

Trachyderini